The 1976–77 Challenge Cup was the 76th staging of rugby league's oldest knockout competition, the Challenge Cup.
The final was contested by Leeds and Widnes at Wembley.

Leeds beat Widnes 16-7 at Wembley in front of a crowd of 80,871.

The winner of the Lance Todd Trophy was the Leeds prop, Steve Pitchford.

This was Leeds’ tenth Cup final win in fourteen Final appearances.

First round

Second round

Quarter-finals

Semi-finals

Final

References

External links
Challenge Cup official website 
Challenge Cup 1976/77 results at Rugby League Project

Challenge Cup
Challenge Cup